Ulopeza crocochalca is a moth in the family Crambidae. It was described by Snellen in 1880. It is found in the Democratic Republic of Congo.

References

Moths described in 1933
Spilomelinae